Kandy Kake is a product produced by the Tasty Baking Company as part of the Tastykake product line.
 Kandy Kake was the original name of the Baby Ruth candy bar.
 Kandy Kakes is the name of a roller derby competitor in the Gotham Girls Roller Derby league.
They were originally called "Tandy Takes"